Linn is a unisex given name or nickname. It may refer to:

Given name

Women
 Linn Githmark (born 1982), Norwegian curler
 Linn Gossé (born 1986), Norwegian handball player
 Linn Grant (born 1999), Swedish golfer
 Linn Siri Jensen (born 1961), Norwegian team handball goalkeeper and coach
 Linn Nyrønning (born 1981), Norwegian footballer
 Linn Skåber (born 1970), Norwegian actress, singer, comedian and writer
 Linn Stalsberg (born 1971), Norwegian journalist, columnist and author
 Linn T. Sunne (born 1971), Norwegian children's writer

Men
 Linn Boyd (1800–1859), American politician
 Linn Farrish (1901–1944), American rugby union player and alleged spy for the Soviet Union
 Linn A. Forrest (1905–1987), American architect
 Linn F. Mollenauer (1937–2021), American physicist
 Linn Sheldon (1919–2006), American children's television host and actor

Nickname
 Linn Berggren (born 1970), Swedish singer-songwriter, former member of the pop music band Ace of Base
 Linn Ullmann (born 1966), Norwegian author and journalist

Unisex given names